Gymnopleurini is a tribe of scarab beetles, in the dung beetle subfamily (Scarabaeinae), but it may now be combined with the Scarabaeini. The side edge of each elytron (hardened fore-wing protecting the hind-wing) has a characteristic shape that exposed the underlying pleural sclerites (side plates of the abdomen). Relative to other dung beetles they are of moderate size (10–18 mm long).

Ecology
All species fly during the day (diurnal). They are probably all ball-rollers: a ball is fashioned from the dung, and rolled away from it, either by a single beetle or a pair of beetles. A short tunnel is dug in the soil, and the ball is buried at the end of it. After reworking the ball, the female lays an egg in a depression in the ball, and covers it with dung. The brood is then abandoned; after hatching, larvae feed on the dung ball.

Taxonomy
There are four genera in this tribe: 
Allogymnopleurus
Garreta
Gymnopleurus
Paragymnopleurus

References

External links

Scarabaeidae
Scarabaeinae